Lee Township is one of eighteen townships in Buena Vista County, Iowa, USA. As of the 2000 census, its population was 272.

Geography 
According to the USGS, it contains two cemeteries: Lone Tree and Saint Josephs.

References

External links 
 US-Counties.com
 City-Data.com

Townships in Buena Vista County, Iowa
Townships in Iowa